Glossary of football terms may refer to:

Glossary of American football
Glossary of association football terms
Glossary of Australian rules football
Glossary of Canadian football
Glossary of Gaelic games terms
Glossary of rugby league terms
Glossary of rugby union terms